The Three Percenters, also styled 3 Percenters, 3%ers and III%ers, are an American and Canadian far-right anti-government militia.

The group advocates gun ownership rights and resistance to the U.S. federal government. The group's name derives from the erroneous claim that "...the active forces in the field against the King's tyranny never amounted to more than 3% of the colonists..." during the American Revolution.

The group is based in the U.S. with a presence in Canada. One Canadian expert, Maxime Fiset, a former neo-Nazi who works with the Centre for the Prevention of Radicalization Leading to Violence, considers the group the "most dangerous" extremist group in Canada.

On February 21, 2021, their leadership dissolved the American national group in response to the 2021 United States Capitol attack, condemning the violence. Other Three Percenters remain as independent local groups. In June 2021, six men associated with the group were indicted for conspiracy, and Canada declared the group a terrorist entity.

Foundation and membership 
The movement has been characterized as part of the broader patriot movement. Founded in 2008, it was given impetus by the election of Barack Obama as president of the United States. Members believed that Obama's presidency would lead to increased government interference in the lives of individuals, and particularly stricter gun-control laws. Many members are former or current members of the military, police and other law-enforcement agencies, as well as anti-government groups such as the Oath Keepers.The movement was co-founded by Michael "Mike" Brian Vanderboegh from Alabama, a member of the Oath Keepers, a group with whom the Three Percenters remain loosely allied and are often compared. Vanderboegh claimed to have formerly been a member of Students for a Democratic Society and the Socialist Workers Party, but abandoned left-wing politics and politics in general in 1977 after being introduced to libertarianism. Vanderboegh said the book The Road to Serfdom pushed him to the right. He became a Second Amendment activist and by the 1990s was involved with the militia movement.

The Anti-Defamation League (ADL) reports that in the mid-1990s, Vanderboegh claimed to be commander of an Alabama militia group, the First Alabama Cavalry Regiment, though he appeared to be its sole member. After the Oklahoma City bombing in 1995, Vanderboegh became better known for popularizing anti-government conspiracy theories.

The group's website states that it does not discriminate against anyone; however, in response to Black Lives Matter protests following the 2014 shooting of Michael Brown in Ferguson, Missouri, the Three Percenters' Facebook page featured numerous racist comments made by its supporters. In response to events at the 2017 Unite the Right rally, the group issued a statement that they "strongly reject and denounce anyone who calls themselves a patriot or a Three Percenter that has attended or is planning on attending any type of protest or counter protest related to these white supremacist and Nazi groups".

Ideology 
The group's website states it is "not a militia" and "not anti-government". According to the ADL, Three Percenters constitute a major part of the broader anti-government militia movement, whose ideology they share. Three Percenters believe that ordinary citizens must take a stand against perceived abuses by the U.S. federal government, which they characterize as overstepping its Constitutional limits. Its stated goals include protecting the right to keep and bear arms, and to "push back against tyranny". The group opposes federal involvement in what they consider local affairs, and states in its bylaws that county sheriffs are "the supreme law of the land".

Like other American militia movements, Three Percenters believe in the ability of citizen volunteers with ordinary weapons to successfully resist the United States military. They support this belief by claiming that only around 3% of American colonists fought the British during the American Revolution, a claim which underestimates the number of people who resisted British rule, and which does not take into account the concentration of British forces in coastal cities, the similarity of weapons used by American and British forces, and French support for the colonists.

Organization and activities 

The group's members have a record of involvement in criminal activity, and some have been associated with acts of violence as well as violent threats.

The group's local chapters are structured hierarchically according to its National Bylaws. As well as political activism, chapters also engage in paramilitary activities such as marksmanship training. Membership requires voting and opposing laws the group sees as unconstitutional. Members take an oath similar to that of the US armed forces. Three Percenters who are also active military members are asked to swear an additional oath promising to disobey certain official orders, such as orders to disarm US citizens. The group's Facebook page mostly features posts supporting gun rights.

Vanderboegh self-published a serial novel online, Absolved, in 2008, which he called "a cautionary tale for the out-of-control gun cops of the ATF". On the movement's website, it claims that it is not a militia group, but rather a "national organization made up of patriotic citizens who love their country, their freedoms, and their liberty."

Vanderboegh and his novel Absolved first received wider media attention in 2011, when four suspected militia members in Georgia were arrested for a plan for a biological attack that had supposedly been inspired by the novel. Vanderboegh distanced himself from the alleged plot.

In 2013, Christian Allen Kerodin and associates were working on construction of a walled compound in Benewah County, Idaho, "for Three Percenters", designed to house 7,000 people following a major disaster, an initiative which local law enforcement has described as a "scam".

In April 2013, a group of Jersey City, New Jersey, police officers were disciplined for wearing patches reading "One of the 3%".

Following the 2015 Chattanooga shootings at a strip mall, a military recruitment center and a United States Navy Operational Support Center in Chattanooga, Tennessee, Three Percenters, Oath Keepers, and other militia groups began organizing armed gatherings outside of recruiting centers in several states, with the stated objective of providing protection to service members, who were barred from carrying weapons while on duty in civilian recruitment centers. In response, the Army Command Operations Center Security Division issued a letter ordering soldiers not to interact with or acknowledge armed civilians outside of recruitment centers, and that "If questioned by these alleged concerned citizens, be polite, professional and terminate the conversation immediately and report the incident to local law enforcement", noting that the issuing officer is "sure the citizens mean well, but we cannot assume this in every case and we do not want to advocate this behavior".

An Idaho Three Percenter group protested refugee resettlement in that state in 2015. In 2016, the "3 Percenters of Idaho" group announced it was sending some of its members in support of the occupation of the Malheur National Wildlife Refuge in Oregon, allegedly in order to "secure the perimeter" and to prevent a "Waco-style situation". They left several hours later after being told their assistance was not needed. Two days previously, Vanderboegh had described the occupiers as "a collection of fruits and nuts". "What Bundy and this collection of fruits and nuts has done is give the feds the perfect opportunity to advance their agenda to discredit us", he said. Michael "Mike" Brian Vanderboegh died August 10, 2016. The group provided security for a 2017 event held by Patriot Prayer called "Rally for Trump and Freedom". Several Three Percenters were also present and providing security for the Unite the Right rally held in Charlottesville, Virginia, in August 2017; along with members of the Redneck Revolt, a left-leaning militia group. After the events at Charlottesville, the group's "National Council" issued a "stand down order", stating, "we will not align ourselves with any type of racist group".

In 2017, a 23-year-old Oklahoma man, Jerry Drake Varnell, was arrested on federal charges of plotting a vehicle bomb attack on a bank in downtown Oklahoma City, modeled after the 1995 Oklahoma City bombing. During a meeting in 2017 with undercover FBI agents, Varnell identified with the Three Percenters movement, saying that he subscribed to "III% ideology" and intended "to start the next revolution." In March 2020, Varnell  was found guilty of conspiracy to use an explosive device to damage a building used in interstate commerce, and planning to use a weapon of mass destruction against property used in interstate commerce. He was sentenced to 25 years in prison.

In 2018, three men were arrested in connection with the bombing of the Dar Al-Farooq Islamic Center in Bloomington, Minnesota. The bombing was non-lethal. One of the men involved, former sheriff's deputy Michael B. Hari, had connections to the III%s.

In June 2019, Oregon Governor Kate Brown sent the Oregon State Police to bring 11 absent Republican state senators back to the Oregon State Capitol. The Republican state senators had gone into hiding to prevent a vote on a cap-and-trade proposal with a goal of lowering greenhouse gas emissions by 2050 in order to combat climate change. The Three Percenters offered support for the Republican senators, declaring they would be "doing whatever it takes to keep these senators safe". On June 22, 2019, a session of the Oregon Senate was cancelled when the Oregon State Capitol was closed due to a warning from the state police of a "possible militia threat".

In May 2020, during a Second Amendment rally on Memorial Day weekend in Frankfort, Kentucky, Three Percenters and other protesters breached several off-limit barriers to access the front porch of the Governor's Mansion, Governor Andy Beshear's primary residence, and began heckling the Mansion's occupants in response to the Governor's restrictions related to the COVID-19 pandemic. Soon afterward, members of the group moved several hundred yards away and raised an effigy bearing the Governor's face and a sign reading sic semper tyrannis ("thus always to tyrants") from a tree. The event drew condemnation from Beshear and from across the political spectrum. Some state officials had joined the Three Percenters at earlier events, including Kentucky State Representatives Savannah Maddox and Stan Lee, and Kentucky State Senator John Schickel. Beshear labeled the group as "radical", that their actions were "aimed at creating fear and terror", and declared that officials who appeared at previous Three Percenter events "cannot fan the flames and then condemn the fire."

Three Percenters Barry Croft and Adam Fox took part in a plot to kidnap Michigan Governor Gretchen Whitmer, one  being the second-in-command of the Wisconsin branch.

Colorado congresswoman Lauren Boebert has close ties to the group.

2021 Capitol attack  

Supporters of the Three Percenters, were present and wore emblematic gear or symbols during the protests and storming of the U.S. Capitol on January 6, 2021.  other groups attending included the Proud Boys and Oath Keepers. After breaking through police lines or being let through multiple police perimeters, these groups occupied, vandalized, breached the Capitol Building and ransacked it for several hours.

At least one man tied to the Three Percenter movement was arrested and charged with involvement of the attack; the man was also reportedly tied to two other extremist groups, the Proud Boys and Oath Keepers. At the time of the January 6 protests, a truck owned by Illinois State Rep. Chris Miller (the husband of U.S. Representative Mary Miller) was in a restricted area next to the Capitol and bore a Three Percenters decal logo. On March 18, 2021, the Illinois House voted to censure Miller for attending the January 6 “Save America” rally that preceded the insurrection at the Capitol by supporters of former President Donald Trump.

Indictments and sentences

Guy Reffitt, from Wylie, TX and a member of the Three Percenters was present at the January 6 United States Capitol attack wearing body armor and carrying a handgun and plastic handcuffs on the Capitol grounds with the intent to remove House speaker Nancy Pelosi and Senate majority leader Mitch McConnell from the premises. 
He was referred to as the guy that “lit the match” and helped to ignite the crowd into an “unstoppable force”.  He was found guilty of five charges and was sentenced to more than seven years in prison.

In June 2021, four men who identified as members of the Three Percenters, and two other men associated with them, were indicted by a grand jury for "conspiring to obstruct congressional proceedings." The indictment alleges that they coordinated travel to Washington D.C. with intent for disruption; some were wearing body armor, tactical gear and at least one carried a knife. They alleged they were acting as security for principals such as Trump friend and advisor Roger Stone. All have pled not guilty. They are:  
Alan Hostetter of San Clemente, CA, former police Chief of La Habra and yoga instructor, was accused of conspiracy to obstruct an official proceeding. 
Erik Scott Warner of Menifee, CA, is charged with federal offenses that include conspiracy, obstructing an official proceeding, and unlawful entry on restricted building or grounds.
Felipe Antonio “Tony” Martinez of Lake Elsinore, CA, is charged with federal offenses that include conspiracy, obstructing an official proceeding, and unlawful entry on restricted building or grounds.  
Derek Kinnison of Lake Elsinore, CA, is charged with federal offenses that include conspiracy, obstructing an official proceeding, and unlawful entry on restricted building or grounds, and tampering with documents or proceedings.
Ronald Mele of Temecula, CA, is charged with federal offenses that include conspiracy, obstructing an official proceeding, and unlawful entry on restricted building or grounds.
Russell Taylor of Ladera Ranch, is charged with federal offenses that include conspiracy, obstructing an official proceeding, and unlawful entry on restricted building or grounds.  He is also charged with obstructing law enforcement during a civil disorder and unlawful possession of a dangerous weapon on Capitol grounds.

Canada 
On June 25, 2021, the group was added to the Canadian Criminal Code's list of terrorist entities to prevent them from accessing financial support.

See also 

Boogaloo movement
Christian Patriot movement
List of militia organizations in the United States
Patriot Front
Posse Comitatus (organization)
Proud Boys
Oath Keepers

References

Further reading 
 

2008 establishments in Alabama
Organizations designated as terrorist by Canada
Patriot movement
Political movements in the United States
Canadian far-right political movements
Groups and movements involved with the January 6 United States Capitol attack